The 1999 Calgary Stampeders finished in 2nd place in the West Division with a 12–6 record. They attempted to repeat as Grey Cup champions but lost to the Hamilton Tiger-Cats.

Offseason

CFL Draft

Preseason

Regular season

Season standings

Season schedule

Awards and records

1999 CFL All-Stars

Offence 
 RB – Kelvin Anderson
 SB – Allen Pitts
 WR – Travis Moore
 OT – Rocco Romano

Defence 
 CB – William Hampton

Special teams 
 K – Mark McLoughlin

Western All-Star Selections

Offence 
 RB – Kelvin Anderson
 SB – Terry Vaughn
 SB – Allen Pitts
 WR – Travis Moore
 OT – Rocco Romano

Defence 
 CB – William Hampton, Calgary Stampeders
 DB – Jack Kellogg, Calgary Stampeders
 DS – Greg Frers, Calgary Stampeders

Special teams 
 K – Mark McLoughlin, Calgary Stampeders

Playoffs

West Semi-Final

West Final

Grey Cup

References

Calgary Stampeders seasons
N. J. Taylor Trophy championship seasons
Calgary Stampeders Season, 1999